Gorm (Graphical Object Relationship Modeller) is a graphical user interface builder application. It is part of the developer tools of GNUstep. Gorm is the equivalent of Interface Builder that was originally found on NeXTSTEP, then OPENSTEP, and finally on Mac OS X. It supports the old .nib files as well as its own .gorm file format.

Gorm and Project Center represent the heart of the suite for GNUstep. Gorm follows Interface Builder so closely that using tutorials written for the latter is possible without much hassle and thus brings the power of Interface Builder to the open source world, being part of the GNU project.

Gorm allows developers to quickly create graphical applications and to design every little aspect of the application's user interface. The developer can drag and drop all types of objects such as menus, buttons, tables, lists and browsers into the interface. With the mouse, it is possible to resize, move or convert the objects or connect them to functions, as well as to edit nearly every aspect of them using Gorm's powerful inspectors.

See also

 GNUstep Renaissance - framework for XML description of portable GNUstep/Mac OS X user interfaces
 Linux on the desktop
 Glade Interface Designer

External links

 http://www.gnustep.org/experience/Gorm.html - a general page about Gorm
 http://mediawiki.gnustep.org/index.php/Gorm_Manual - The Gorm Manual
 http://www.gnustep.it/pierre-yves/index.html - "GNUstep development tools: a basic tutorial"

Free software programmed in Objective-C
GNU Project software
GNUstep
User interface builders
Software that uses GNUstep